The Liturgy of Saint James is a form of Christian liturgy used by some Eastern Christians of the Byzantine rite and West Syriac Rite. It is developed from an ancient Egyptian form of the Basilean anaphoric family, and is influenced by the traditions of the rite of the Church of Jerusalem, as the Mystagogic Catecheses of Cyril of Jerusalem imply. It became widespread in Church of Antioch from the fourth or fifth century onwards, replacing the older Basilean Liturgy of Antioch. It is still the principal liturgy of the Syriac Orthodox Church, the Malankara Orthodox Syrian Church, the Maronite Church, the Syriac Catholic Church, Syro-Malankara Catholic Church and other churches employing the West Syriac Rite. It is also occasionally used in the Eastern Orthodox Church and Melkite Catholic Church. The Malankara Mar Thoma Syrian Church uses a reformed variant of this liturgy, omitting intercession of saints and prayer for the dead.

The liturgy is attributed with the name of James the Just, the brother of Jesus and patriarch among the Jewish Christians at Jerusalem.  

The historic Antiochene liturgies are divided between Alexandrian and Cappadocian usages. Among these, the Liturgy of Saint James is one of the liturgies that evolved from the Alexandrian usage; others include Coptic Anaphora of Saint Basil, the Byzantine Liturgy of Saint Basil and the Liturgy of Saint John Chrysostom. The liturgies attributed to Saint John Chrysostom and Saint Basil are the ones most widely used today by all Byzantine Rite Christians, including the Eastern Orthodox, Byzantine Rite Lutherans, and some Eastern Catholic Churches.

Manuscript tradition
Its date of composition is still disputed, but most authorities propose a fourth-century date for the known form, because the anaphora seems to have been developed from an ancient Egyptian form of the Basilean anaphoric family united with the anaphora described in The Catechisms of St. Cyril of Jerusalem.

The earliest manuscript is the ninth-century codex, Vaticanus graecus 2282, which had been in liturgical use at Damascus, in the diocese of Antioch.

The only critical edition is the one published by Dom B.-Charles Mercier in the Patrologia Orientalis, vol. 26 (1950).

Order of liturgy 
The Liturgy of Saint James the Just is the skeleton of the whole Qurbono Qadisho with all the prayers before the anaphora being exactly the same, no matter which anaphora is chosen. The Liturgy of St James the Just comprises:

The First Service
Prothesis
The Second Service
Reading from the Holy Books
The Trisagion
Antiphon before the Pauline Epistle (Galatians 1:8-9)
The Epistle of Saint Paul
The Third Service
The Husoyo (Liturgy of Absolution)
The Proemion
The Sedro (Main Prayer)
The Etro (Fragrance/incense prayer)
The Anaphora
The Kiss of peace
Veiling and placing of the hands prayer
The Dialogue
Preface
Sanctus (Qadish)
Words of Institution
Anamnesis
Epiclesis
Petitions
Fracturing
Liturgy of Repentance
Lord's Prayer (Abun dbashmayo)
Invitation to Holy Communion
The Procession of the Holy Mysteries
Prayer of Thanksgiving
The Dismissal of the Faithful

In the books of the Patriarchal Sharfet seminary, this order is clearly strict, with the deacon and congregation prayer being the same no matter which anaphora is used. The only prayer that changes when a different anaphora is used is that of the priest.

Rubrics

The Liturgy of St. James is commonly celebrated on the feast day of Saint James (October 23) and the first Sunday after Christmas, and then almost exclusively celebrated on a daily basis in Jerusalem, in the Eastern Orthodox Church. The Liturgy of Saint James is long, taking some hours to complete in full. The recitation of the Divine Liturgy is performed according to the worship rubrics of a particular Rite, with specific parts chanted by the presider, the lectors, the choir, and the congregated faithful, at certain times in unison. Like other compositions in the Byzantine tradition, the Divine Liturgy of St. James as celebrated in Greek forms the basis of the English transcription. In its Syriac form, the Liturgy is still used in the Syriac and Indian Churches - Catholic and Orthodox - both in a Syriac translation and in Malayalam and English.

During the Offertory, the partiture calls for a Cherubic Hymn chanted by readers as the priest brings the gifts to be consecrated onto the altar. In the Latin Catholic Church, this composition became popular as a separate hymn of adoration of the Blessed Sacrament, known in English as Let All Mortal Flesh Keep Silence.

Musical annotation
The hymnographers of the early Church composed both the words of the sung prayers and the tones of the musical scale to be sung in a single codex for a particular community. The annotation was recorded in close correspondence to the text (for sample codices, see those collated by the North American Greek Orthodox Monastery of St. Anthony in Arizona) with neumes indicating the melodic tones and their duration used before the adoption of the Western system of staff and scales became established in medieval times. In those communities that worship in Syriac the neumes are mirror images of those used by the authocthonous Greek and Slavic Orthodox Churches and written and read right to left in accordance with the Syriac script of the prayer texts.

The English Hymnal features the 1906 Ralph Vaughan Williams arrangement of the English verses of the Cherubic hymn of the Offertory chant (see above) to the melody of the French folk tune Picardy. The hymn known as Let All Mortal Flesh Keep Silence is also popular in the Roman Catholic Latin rite as an alternative to the spoken communion antiphon.

See also

 Anaphora (liturgy)

References

Further reading
 L. H. Dalmais, Eastern Liturgies (1960)
 Eric Segelberg,Έὺχῂ τοῦ Θυμιάματος. Towards the history of a prayer in the Liturgy of St. James." In: Έὑχαριστῄριον, Τιμητικὸς τὁμος ἐπί τή 45ετηρίδι έπιστημόικης δράσεως καἰ τῇ 35ετηρίδι τακτικῆς καθηγεσἱας Α. Σ. Άλιβιζάτου. Athens 1958, reprinted in Segelberg, ''Gnostica - Mandaica Liturgica."" (Acta Universitatis Upsaliensis. Historia Religionum 11.) Uppsala 1990.
 Thomas F. Coffey and Maryjane Dunn, The Sermons & Liturgy of Saint James: Book I of the Liber Sancti Jacobi  (2021)

External links

 The Divine Liturgies Music Project Byzantine music in English for the Liturgy of St. James
 Catholic Encyclopedia: "Liturgy of Jerusalem"
 Liturgy of St. James in Ante-Nicene Fathers
 Anaphora of St James, online Syriac Orthodox Resources at The Catholic University of America

4th-century Christian texts
Eastern Christian liturgies
Christian liturgical texts
Anaphoras (liturgy)
Christianity in Jerusalem
Christian terminology
James, brother of Jesus